Ferdinand Magellan (1480–1521) was a Portuguese explorer.

Magellan may also refer to:

People 

Jean Hyacinthe de Magellan (1723–1790), Portuguese natural philosopher
 Murielle Magellan (born 1967), French writer and theater director

Places
4055 Magellan, an Amor asteroid
 Magellan Bay, Philippines
Magellan's Cross, a geographic location in the Philippines
Sea of Magellan, see Pacific Ocean
Strait of Magellan, a geographic location in South America
Magellan Rise, a suburb of Hamilton New Zealand

Geology
Magellan Seamounts - Range in North West Pacific Ocean west of Marshall Islands.
Magellan Rise - Oceanic Plateau east of the Marshall Islands
North Magellan Rise - Ocean floor feature south west of Hawaii and east of the Marshall Islands

Arts, entertainment, and media

Film and TV
Magellan, a sequence of 24 short films by Hollis Frampton

Fictional entities
Magellan, the survival space research vessel in the 2001 science fiction film Ice Planet
Magellan, an interstellar ark or generation starship in Arthur C. Clarke's science fiction novel The Songs of Distant Earth

Other arts, entertainment, and media
Magellan (band), a progressive rock band
"Magellan", a 1971 novelty song by Yoyoy Villame

Astronomy
Magellan (spacecraft), a NASA uncrewed space mission to Venus
Giant Magellan Telescope in Chile
Magellan Telescopes at Las Campanas, Chile
Magellanic Clouds, or Clouds of Magellan

Brands and enterprises
Magellan Aerospace, a Canadian aerospace manufacturer
Magellan Corporation, a global distributor of specialty steel based out of Chicago, Illinois
Magellan Data and Mapping Strategies, a political polling firm that serves Republican Party candidates and organizations
Magellan Financial Group, an Australian investment manager
Magellan Fund, a mutual fund offered by Fidelity Investments
Magellan Midstream Partners, American oil pipeline corporation
Magellan Navigation Inc, a maker of GPS equipment

Circumnavigation and exploration
Order of Magellan, given by the Circumnavigators Club

Computing and technology
Magellan (search engine), a forerunner of the Excite web portal
Lotus Magellan, a file manager software

Transportation
CMA CGM Magellan, a 2010 container ship
Ferdinand Magellan (railcar), a former presidential rail car
MS Magellan (ship, 1985), a former cruise ship

Other uses
Magellan sheep dog, a dog originated in Chile

See also
Magalhães, the Portuguese form of the name
Magellana, a moth genus
Magallanes (disambiguation), the Spanish form of the name
Magellanic (disambiguation)